The consumer leverage ratio, a concept popularized by William Jarvis and Dr. Ian C MacMillan in a series of articles in the Harvard Business Review, is the ratio of total household debt, as reported by the Federal Reserve System, to disposable personal income, as reported by the US Department of Commerce, Bureau of Economic Analysis.  The ratio has been used in economic analysis and reporting and has been compared to other relevant economic variables since the 1970s.

Overview
The concept in a variety of other forms has been used to quantify the amount of debt the average American consumer has, relative to his/her disposable income. As of the fourth quarter of 2016, the ratio in the US stood at 1.04x, down from highs of 1.29x seen in 2007. The historical average ratio since late 1975 is approximately 0.9x.

Many economists argue the rapid growth in consumer leverage has been the primary fuel of corporate earnings growth in the past few decades and thus represents significant economic risk and reward to the US economy. Jarvis and MacMillan quantify this risk within specific businesses and industries in a ratio form as Consumer Leverage Exposure (CLE).

Formula

 

In essence, the CLR demonstrates how many years it would take on average to pay off the debt in full if the whole annual disposable income were used to do so. The consumer leverage ratio in the US was increasing in the years prior to the financial crisis of 2008, peaking at 1.29 and decreasing ever since.

See also 
Bureau of Economic Analysis
Consumer
Consumer debt
Consumer economics
Economic indicators
Federal Reserve System
Harvard Business Review

References

External links 
Consumer Credit: The Next Crisis
HBR Editor's Blog:  
Harvard Business Review, October 2009
Harvard Business Review Toolkit
Harvard Business Review CLE Calculator
Measuring Consumer Leverage Exposure
Rita Gunther McGrath's Blog
The Narrow Bridge Blog by Anya Kamenetz
WSJ Blog: Real Time Economics

Economic indicators
Financial economics